Parbatsar is a town and a municipality in Nagaur district in the Indian state of Rajasthan. As of the 2001 India census, Parbatsar had a population of 80,000. Males constitute 54% of the population and females 46%. Parbatsar has an average literacy rate of 80%, higher than the national average of 59.5%: male literacy is 72%, and female literacy is 47%. In Parbatsar, 16% of the population is under 6 years of age.

Administration 
The SDM or Sub-divisional Magistrate of Parbatsar is Balbir Singh

References

Cities and towns in Nagaur district